The Fidelity Medallion is the oldest decoration of the United States military and was created by act of the Continental Congress in 1780.  Also known as the "André Capture Medal", the Fidelity Medallion was awarded to those soldiers who participated in the capture of Major John André, of the British Army, who had been the contact to Benedict Arnold and had helped organize his defection.

Historical records indicate that three soldiers, all members of the militia of New York state, were awarded the Fidelity Medallion after its first issuance:  Private John Paulding, Private David Williams, and Private Isaac Van Wart.

The obverse of the medallion was inscribed ""; the reverse, with the motto, "", which means, "The love of country conquers."

The Fidelity Medallion was never again bestowed and it quickly became regarded as a commemorative decoration.  For this reason, the Badge of Military Merit is generally considered the first decoration of the U.S. military, even though it was created two years after the Fidelity Medallion, in 1782.

Authorizing statute

Disposition of the three Medallions
All three of the original Medallions were thought to be lost.  Isaac Van Wart's example was thought to be lost at the time of his death in 1828, but is actually in the hands of a descendant in Westchester County, NY.  John Paulding's and David Williams' medallions were both donated to the New-York Historical Society in 1905 which displayed them in a locked, glass-topped case.  In mid-1975, the two Medallions were stolen, along with the pocket watch originally belonging to Major John André.  The Historical Society did not go public with the loss at the time, and none of the items have been recovered.

Replicas
In the two centuries since the original Fidelity Medallions were issued, replicas have occasionally been produced in metals including silver, pewter, lead and bronze and in varying degrees of historical accuracy.  The American Numismatic Society has six different specimens in their collection.

An auction catalog, published for a September 2012 sale which featured a replica of the award, includes a description of the Fidelity Medallion:

 [...] Fidelity Medallion, the oldest decoration of the United States military and created by act of the Continental Congress in 1780. It is also referred to as "André Capture Medal" as historical records indicate that it was awarded to three soldiers from the New York Militia, David Williams, John Paulding and Isaac Van Wert, who aided in the arrest of Major John André for his role in organizing Benedict Arnold's defection to the British Army. The medal is 55 mm × 41 mm, beautifully struck. The face of the medallion contains the inscription "FIDELITY" and the reverse "AMOR PATRIÆ VINCIT" ("The love of country conquers").

At the time, the medal did not sell.

References

1780 in the United States
Awards and decorations of the United States Army
Awards established in 1780
Ordinances of the Continental Congress
Wound decorations